Lindfield Rural  is a civil parish in the Mid Sussex District of West Sussex, England. The parish council meets in the Millennium Hall in the village of Scaynes Hill.

Landmarks
Scaynes Hill is a Site of Special Scientific Interest within the parish. The site is a disused quarry, which has exposed sandstone originating from the Wealden flood plain.

References

Mid Sussex District